Henry Baring (18 January 1777 – 13 April 1848) was a British banker and politician. He was the third son of Sir Francis Baring, 1st Baronet, the founder of the family banking firm that grew into Barings Bank. His grandfather Johann Baring emigrated from Germany and established the family in England.

Early life
Henry Baring was a member of the Baring family, and the third of five sons of Sir Francis Baring, 1st Baronet, and Harriet, daughter of William Herring. Sir Thomas Baring, 2nd Baronet, and Alexander Baring, 1st Baron Ashburton, were his elder brothers.

Career
Henry, along with his older brothers Thomas and Alexander, became partners in the firm in 1804. Less interested in banking than his brothers, Henry retired from partnership in 1823. He also sat as Member of Parliament for Bossiney from 1806 to 1807, and for Colchester from 1820 to 1826.

Personal life

Baring was twice married. He married firstly Maria Matilda Bingham, daughter of U.S. Senator William Bingham (his brother Alexander also married a Bingham daughter) and former wife of James Alexander, Comte de Tilly, in 1802. They had three sons and two daughters.

He divorced Maria in 1824, and married Cecilia Anne Windham, daughter of Vice-Admiral William Lukin Windham, in 1825, through which marriage Cromer Hall came into the family. They had at least seven sons and one daughter. Several of his children and descendants gained distinction. His eldest son from his first marriage, Henry Bingham Baring, was a politician, father of Lieutenant-General Charles Baring and grandfather of Sir Godfrey Baring, 1st Baronet. His second son from his second marriage was Edward Baring, 1st Baron Revelstoke, whose fifth son was the man-of-letters Maurice Baring. His sixth son from his second marriage was Evelyn Baring, 1st Earl of Cromer. Baring died in April 1848. His second wife died in October 1874, aged 71.

References

External links 
 

Henry
1776 births
1848 deaths
Younger sons of baronets
Members of the Parliament of the United Kingdom for English constituencies
UK MPs 1806–1807
UK MPs 1820–1826
British bankers